The FAW Futsal Cup is a national competition organised by the Football Association of Wales in the game of futsal.

In 2011, The New Saints won a major futsal competition and as a representative of Wales for the first time advanced to the UEFA Futsal Cup.

Winners
2011 - The New Saints Futsal Club
2012 - Cardiff University Futsal Club
2013 - Wrexham Futsal Club
2014 - Wrexham Futsal Club
2015 - Cardiff University Futsal Club
2016 - Cardiff University Futsal Club
2017 - Wrexham Futsal Club
2018 - Cardiff University Futsal Club

See also 
FAW Elite Futsal League

References

External links
FAW Official website

Futsal competitions in Wales
Wales